Brazilea is an extinct genus of algae. The species Brazilea helby and Brazilea scissa were located in outcrop Morro do Papaléo in the town of Mariana Pimentel, the geopark Paleorrota. The outcrop (Itararé Subgroup) dates to the Sakmarian of the Permian.

References 

Palynology
Permian plants
Prehistoric plants of South America
Permian life of South America
Permian Brazil
Fossils of Brazil
Paraná Basin
Fossil taxa described in 1967